The Power of Darkness (Vlast′ t′my) is a five-act drama by Leo Tolstoy. Written in 1886, the play's production was forbidden in Russia until 1902, mainly through the influence of Konstantin Pobedonostsev. In spite of the ban, the play was unofficially produced and read numerous times.

Overview
The central character is a peasant, Nikita, who seduces and abandons a young orphan girl Marinka; then the lovely Anisija murders her own husband to marry Nikita. He impregnates his new stepdaughter, then, under his wife's influence, murders the baby. On the day of his stepdaughter's marriage, he surrenders himself and confesses to the police.

Production history
French theatre pioneer André Antoine staged La Puissance des Ténèbres—a French translation of the play, by Pavlovsky and Oscar Méténier—in Paris at the Théâtre Montparnasse on 10 February 1888 to great acclaim. Constantin Stanislavski, the Russian theatre practitioner, had wanted to stage the play in 1895; he had persuaded Tolstoy to rewrite act four along lines that Stanislavski had suggested, but the production did not materialise. He eventually staged it with his Moscow Art Theatre in 1902. That production opened on 5 December and enjoyed some success. Stanislavski, however, was scathingly critical, particularly of his own performance as Mitrich. Years later, in his autobiography My Life in Art, he wrote:

Actor Jacob Adler had a New York hit in 1904 with his own Yiddish translation—the first successful production of a Tolstoy play in the United States.

In 1923, the German epic theatre director Erwin Piscator staged the play at his "proletarian Volksbühne" (a rival to the Volksbühne), in Berlin. "Our intention," Piscator writes, "was to move toward a political message from a broad artistic base." The production opened on 19 January at the Central-Theater on the Alte Jakob Strasse. Having aimed for "the greatest possible realism in acting and decor," Piscator described his production as "thoroughly naturalistic." Herbert Ihering approved of its attempt to bring serious drama at low ticket-prices to working-class audiences, though he thought that its attention to naturalistic detail distracted from the core meaning of the play.

Mint Theater Company staged a production of the play in New York City in 2007. They used a new translation by director Martin Platt.

Notes

Works cited
 Adler, Jacob. 1999. A Life on the Stage: A Memoir. Translated by Lulla Rosenfeld. New York: Knopf. .
 Benedetti, Jean. 1999. Stanislavski: His Life and Art. Revised edition. Original edition published in 1988. London: Methuen. .
 Piscator, Erwin. 1980. The Political Theatre. Trans. Hugh Rorrison. London: Methuen. . Originally published in 1929; revised edition 1963.
 Rorrison, Hugh. 1980. Editorial notes. In Piscator (1980).
 Willett, John. 1978. The Theatre of Erwin Piscator: Half a Century of Politics in the Theatre. London: Methuen. .

External links
 
 The Power of Darkness, at RevoltLib.com
 The Power of Darkness, at Marxists.org
 The Power of Darkness, at TheAnarchistLibrary.org
 The Power of Darkness, at Project Gutenberg

1886 plays
Plays by Leo Tolstoy